African sites may refer to:

 African Sites: Archaeology in the Caribbean
 List of World Heritage Sites in Africa
 African-American Heritage Sites